Fort Egypt, a large log house, is a historic landmark in Page County, Virginia and is listed in the National Register of Historic Places (#79003064).

Built of 20"-25" diameter logs dovetailed at the corners, Fort Egypt has a massive stone chimney in the center of the house.  It contains a fortified cellar with loop holes, possibly designed for protection against Indian attacks.  No known Indian attacks occurred at Fort Egypt.

The building was built about 1758 by Jacob Strickler (one of the early leaders of the Mennonite Church), and his descendants lived here for many generations.  Several of the rooms are very large and were probably used for meetings of the Mennonite Church in this community before any church buildings were built.

This home is located near the center of the 1,000 acre (4 km2) tract granted to the pioneer Abraham Strickler in 1735 and called the Egypt Bend tract.

The building was restored by its current owners and is in an excellent state of preservation.

References

External links
Link to a website on Fort Egypt
Link to a painting of Fort Egypt
Fort Egypt, State Route 615, Luray, Page County, VA: 14 photos, 11 measured drawings, and 4 data pages at Historic American Buildings Survey

Infrastructure completed in 1758
Houses on the National Register of Historic Places in Virginia
Houses in Page County, Virginia
National Register of Historic Places in Page County, Virginia
Historic American Buildings Survey in Virginia
Log buildings and structures on the National Register of Historic Places in Virginia